Kapila Abhayawansa PhD, (Sri Lanka) is the Dean of the Faculty of Religious Studies, International Buddhist College, Thailand.

Career
Prior to joining the college, he was a professor and head of the Department of Buddhist Culture at the Postgraduate Institute of Pali and Buddhist Studies, University of Kelaniya, Sri Lanka. His areas of specialization are the history of Western and Eastern philosophy, Mahayana Buddhist philosophy, and Buddhist monastic discipline.

References

Buddhist studies scholars
Sri Lankan Buddhists
Living people
Kapila Abhayawansa
Year of birth missing (living people)